Walkabout is the third studio album by Najwa Nimri, released in 2006.

Track listing
"I'll Wait For Us" – 5:20
"So Often" – 4:48
"Just in Case" – 3:42
"Capable" – 3:29
"Push It" – 3:36
"Le tien, le mien" – 4:28
"I Like It" – 4:59
"Sexy Light" – 3:51
"One of Those Days" – 3:48
"Being Safe" – 3:35

Singles
"Capable" – January 23, 2006  
"Push It"
"Le Tien, Le Mien"

2006 albums